Hammer Odde Lighthouse is located on the northernmost point of Hammeren, just outside Sandvig on the Danish island of Bornholm.

History and description
Hammer Odde Lighthouse was built in 1885 to complement the nearly Hammeren Lighthouse which, owing to its high altitude , could not always be seen from the sea in foggy weather. The whitewashed square-shaped tower has a height of just . From the start, the lighthouse was equipped with a rotating lens, giving two short blinks every 10 seconds. In 1939, radio equipment was installed, making it one of the most modern facilities of its kind.

See also

List of lighthouses and lightvessels in Denmark

References

Lighthouses completed in 1885
Lighthouses in Denmark
Buildings and structures in Bornholm